Stegania is a genus of moths in the family Geometridae. It was erected by Achille Guenée in 1845.

Description
The palpi are minute, slender, porrect (extending forward) and hairy. The hind tibia is slightly dilated. Forewings with stalked veins 7, 8 and 9, from upper angle. Vein 10 absent.

Species
Stegania cararia (Hubner, 1790)
Stegania dalmataria Guenée, 1857
Stegania dilectaria (Hubner, 1790)
Stegania frixa (Prout, 1937)
Stegania mesonephele (Wiltshire, 1967)
Stegania ochrearia Bang-Haas, 1910
Stegania oranaria (Wehrli, 1930)
Stegania postrecta (Wehrli, 1930)
Stegania trimaculata (Villers, 1789)
Stegania wiltshirei (Ebert, 1965)

References

External links
 
 
 

Abraxini